Defence was an American Revolutionary War privateer that was part of the 1779 Penobscot Expedition, during the American Revolutionary War. A brigantine, she was built that year in Beverly, Massachusetts, and was scuttled near Stockton Springs, Maine in the later stages of the expedition.  The wreck site was excavated in the 1970s, and was listed on the National Register of Historic Places in 1975.

Career
Defence was a new ship, laid down in Beverly, Massachusetts in 1779.  She was owned by Andrew Cabot and Moses Brown, Beverly merchants who operated a number of privateers.  Massachusetts archives list her as a 170-ton brigantine with 16 six-pound cannon and a crew of 100.  Defence was recruited to join the Penobscot Expedition, organized by the state of Massachusetts in response to the seizure of Castine (in what is now Maine on Penobscot Bay) by British forces in June 1779.  She was commissioned on July 6, 1779, with John Edmonds of Beverly as captain.

The expedition sailed in late July 1779.  Due to differences among the commanders, the expedition was never able to mount a successful attack on the British at Castine, and the fleet was scattered after the arrival of British reinforcements on August 13.  All of the ships of the expedition were lost, either sunk, scuttled, burned, or captured over the next two days.  Defence was torched and abandoned in the harbor of Stockton Springs, where she then sank.  The ship's owners were eventually able to recover some compensation from the state for their loss.  They built another privateer, also named Defence, of 140 tons in late 1779.

Wreck site
The location of the wreck was discovered in 1972 during a sonar survey conducted by the Maine Maritime Academy and the Massachusetts Institute of Technology, and was the first wreck associated with the expedition to be found.  Divers that year recovered one of her cannons and other artifacts.  Further dives in 1976 outlined the extent of the wreck (which was found to be in good condition) and recovered further artifacts.  Between then and 1980 additional archaeological work completely excavated the wreck, recovering numerous artifacts.  The remains of the hulk where then reburied under a layer of mud.

Legacy
Nearby Defence Point (formerly known as Squaw Point) and Defence Head were named in honor of the nearby wreck site.  The wreck site was listed on the National Register of Historic Places in 1975.

See also
Dudley Saltonstall, leader of the Penobscot Expedition
Defence (ship) for other ships of the same name
Beverly Cotton Manufactory (Andrew Cabot and Moses Brown were part owners)
Penobscot Expedition Site, underwater sites of additional expedition wrecks in Bangor and Brewer, Maine 
National Register of Historic Places listings in Waldo County, Maine

References

 .  Description of the payment for the vessel and the battle.

Further reading

External links
 Filipe Vieira de Castro, "Description of Defence shipwreck," in Nautical Archaeology of the Americas, ANTH318, Texas A&M University, Spring Semester 2007.
 "The Defence: Revolutionary War Privateer," Discussion of the recovery with photos and bibliography, Texas A&M University, 2002.
 Russell T. Green, "The Devereaux Cove Vessel and the Penobscot Expedition of 1779: An Historical and Archaeological Interpretation of Vessel Remains at Deveraux Cove, Stockton Springs," Ph.D. Thesis,  East Carolina University, 2008.
 Description of the vessel, American War of Independence at Sea website.
 https://web.archive.org/web/20160304100001/https://www.mpbn.net/homestom/p11defence.html
 The Penobscot Expedition Archaeological Project: Field Investigations 2000 and 2001 FINAL REPORT

Age of Sail naval ships of the United States
1779 ships
Brigantines
Maritime incidents in 1779
Shipwrecks on the National Register of Historic Places in Maine
National Register of Historic Places in Waldo County, Maine